William Gayley Simpson (1892 – 1991) was an American white supremacist activist and author associated with William Luther Pierce and the National Alliance.

Early life
The oldest of three children, he was born July 23, 1892, in Elizabeth, New Jersey. He attended Lafayette College and graduated in 1912 with Phi Beta Kappa standing and as valedictorian. He attended Union Theological Seminary, graduating in 1915, magna cum laude.

Career
From the fall of 1918 until the spring of 1919 he was associate director of the National Civil Liberties Bureau, now the American Civil Liberties Union. After living in a small religious community for over 10 years, a period of his life he would come to refer to as his "Franciscan" days, Simpson repudiated his previous Christian moorings and embraced the philosophical worldview of Friedrich Nietzsche. Simpson believed that the teachings of Jesus were completely out of step with nature, and that only a few exceptionally zealous men could ever come close to implementing them. Simpson discussed the importance of distinguishing between subjective religious feeling and "scientific reality."  He came to believe that much of human behavior is rooted in the innate biological makeup of individuals and their race, and that one's spirituality comes from within.

His 1978 book Which Way Western Man? was republished by National Vanguard Books in 2003. In this book, Simpson stated: "I am not naturally a man of violence, but there is one thing from the thought of which I shrink more than from violence or its consequences, and that is the thought that our people may not rise to throw off the death that is being clamped upon them."

His seven-part autobiography titled "One Man's Striving" was originally serialized in 1983 and 1984 issues of National Vanguard magazine, published by the National Alliance. It is a radical right version of Somerset Maugham's "soul voyage" classics such as The Razor's Edge (novel) and Of Human Bondage.

Works 

 A Spiritual Quest and Venture of Faith. (1927)
 Toward The Rising Sun (New York: The Vanguard Press, Inc., 1935)
 Which Way Western Man? (Cooperstown, New York: Yeoman Press, 1978)

References

1892 births
1991 deaths
American white supremacists
American writers